Paul Dunbar may refer to:

 Paul Laurence Dunbar (1872–1906), American poet, novelist, and playwright
 Paul B. Dunbar (1882–1968), American chemist